KIXS (107.9 FM, "KIXS 108") is a radio station serving the Victoria, Texas, area with a country music format. It is under ownership of Townsquare Media.

External links
KIXS 108 - Official Site

IXS
Country radio stations in the United States
Radio stations established in 1980
Townsquare Media radio stations
1980 establishments in Texas